The 1923 Union Bulldogs football team was an American football team that represented Union University of Jackson, Tennessee as an independent during the 1923 college football season. Led by Joe Guyon in his second season as head coach, the Bulldogs compiled an overall record of 4–4–1.

Schedule

References

Union
Union (Tennessee) Bulldogs football seasons
Union Bulldogs football